The first USS Eagle, a schooner, was built at Philadelphia, Pennsylvania, in 1798, and commissioned in the Revenue Cutter Service under the command of Captain H. G. Campbell, USRCS. She was transferred to the Navy in July 1798 for service in the undeclared naval war (Quasi-War) with France, and placed on the permanent Navy List in April 1800.

From October 1798 Eagle patrolled off the coast of South Carolina and Georgia protecting American shipping from French privateers. Ordered to the West Indies, she arrived at Prince Rupert's Bay, Dominica, 14 March 1799, to hunt French ships, and to convoy merchant vessels on the Guadeloupe Station until late in June, when she sailed for New Castle, Delaware.

She returned to the Caribbean in August 1799 for similar duty until 10 September 1800 when she set sail for St. Thomas, Virgin Islands, with the sloop-of-war , escorting a convoy of 52 ships. After arrival at New Castle on 28 September, Eagle was laid up for repairs. Eagle's third cruise to the West Indies extended from January to June 1801, when she returned to Baltimore.

During her career in the United States' navy, she captured or assisted in the capture of 22 French vessels which had been preying on American ocean commerce. Eagle was sold 17 June 1801.

References

Schooners of the United States Navy
Quasi-War ships of the United States
1798 ships